"Little Dreamer" is a single released by the British rock band Status Quo in 1989. It was included on the album Perfect Remedy.

The 7-inch was also issued with a Perfect Remedy tour patch, and the 12-inch was also packaged in a gatefold picture sleeve which featured Status Quo's Christmas Game.

Track listing

7 inch / cassette 
 "Little Dreamer" (Rossi/Frost) (3.58)
 "Rotten to the Bone" (Rossi/Bown) (3.39)

12 inch / CD 
 "Little Dreamer" (Rossi/Frost) (3.58)
 "Rotten to the Bone" (Rossi/Bown) (3.39)
 "Doing It All for You" (Parfitt/Williams) (4.08)

Charts

References 

Status Quo (band) songs
1989 songs
1989 singles
Songs written by Francis Rossi
Song recordings produced by Pip Williams
Vertigo Records singles